Regents Park is a suburb of Johannesburg, South Africa. The suburb is found north of The Hill. It is located in Region F of the City of Johannesburg Metropolitan Municipality.

History
The suburb is situated on part of an old Witwatersrand farm called Klipriviersberg. It was established in 1904 and was named after Regent's Park London.

References

Johannesburg Region F